Marisol Aguirre-Morales Prouvé (born April 1, 1971) is a French Peruvian actress, TV host and model. Currently resides in Peru. She is best known for starring in the telenovela "Gorrión" and host the TV show "Locademia de TV".

Artistic career
Marisol television debut in 1992, when he drove with actor Sergio Galliani, TV program on channel Locademia the state, which was a big TV hit that reached scores rating and according to own statements, plan the return of successful project the 1990s.

In 1994 she starred in the telenovela "Gorrión", where she met the actor Christian Meier, whom he married the following year.

After several years of absence would return briefly to TV in the telenovela "La noche" and then in 2002 with "Que buena raza", then it would continue until the date by telenovelas. She has acted plays, mainly for children and is dedicated to modeling, with the face official some cosmetic brands in Peru.

He reappeared on television in 2008 in the TV series "Esta sociedad 2" youth. In 2009, he returned to host "El otro show", is the same as the things that happens backstage and during rehearsals "El Show de los sueños (Peru)".

In 2011 appears in the telenovela "Yo No Me Llamo Natacha" and then competing in "El Gran Show".

Reality show 
2011: "El Gran Show 2011 (season 2)" (5th Place)
2008: "Los Reyes de la Pista (Perú)" (2nd Place)
2008: "Bailando por un sueño (Perú)" (5th Place)

Film 
2018: "No Me Digas Solterona" María García

References 

Entrevista en Caretas
Marisol y Celine Aguirre conducen el 'Otro Show'

External links
 

1971 births
Living people
French emigrants to Peru
Peruvian film actresses
Peruvian telenovela actresses
Peruvian television actresses
21st-century Peruvian actresses